Bernard Kälin (21 March 1887 – 20 October 1962) was a Swiss Benedictine monk of Muri-Gries Abbey, an abbot of Muri-Gries Abbey, and the third Abbot Primate of the Order of St. Benedict and the Benedictine Confederation.

Biography
Josef Martin Kälin was born in Einsiedeln, Switzerland, on 22 March 1887. His parents were Josef Martin & Anna Verena (née Schön) Kälin. His father was a timber merchant and the family sought to educate all their children. From 1899 to 1907 he attended the high school located at Einsiedeln Abbey. He then entered the monastic life at Muri-Gries Abbey in northern Italy in 1908 and made his religious profession on 5 October 1909 being given the name "Bernard." He continued his education in the fields of Philosophy and Theology at the University of Freiburg and was ordained a Roman Catholic priest on 18 October 1912. He continued his studies at the same university receiving a doctorate in philosophy in 1918 with a dissertation on the Epistemology of Saint Augustine entitled "Die Erkenntnislehre des hl. Augustinus." Between the years 1913-1945 Kälin taught at Kantonsschule Obwalden overseen by the Benedictines, serving as teacher and rector of the school. During this time, he wrote a number of philosophy textbooks that became popular.

On 10 August 1945 Kälin was elected as the Abbot of Muri-Gries Abbey and received his blessing on 13 August 1945. He served in the role for only two years until he was elected as the third Abbot Primate of the Benedictine Confederation and Order of St. Benedict on 16 September 1947. As Abbot Primate he resided in Rome, Italy, while also overseeing Sant'Anselmo all'Aventino. He traveled quite extensively in his role as Abbot Primate, but was also instrumental in his work at the Pontificio Ateneo Sant'Anselmo where he founded a monastic institute, taught philosophy, and redesigned the Church of Sant'Anselmo. He served in this role until 1959 when he was not reelected as Abbot Primate, at which point he returned to Muri-Gries Abbey where he died on 20 October 1962.

Bibliography
 Die Erkenntnislehre des hl. Augustinus Sarnen: Ehrli 1921 (OCLC: 401967569)
 Zur Philosophie der Benediktinerregel Sarnen: Ehrli 1929 (OCLC: 79226154)
 Der Pädagoge Paul Häberlin Einsiedeln: Benziger & Co 1930 (OCLC: 77823674)
 Hundert Jahre Kollegium Sarnen 1841–1941. Eine historisch-statistische Skizze Sarnen: Ehrli 1941 (OCLC: 1270689302)
 Lehrbuch der Philosophie Sarnen:  Selbstverlag Benediktinerkollegium 1950 (OCLC: 73484915)
 Lehrbuch der Philosophie. Band I: Logik, Ontologie, Kosmologie, Psychologie, Kriteriologie und Theodizee Sarnen:  Selbstverlag Benediktinerkollegium 1957 (OCLC:  832441007)
 Lehrbuch der Philosophie. Band II: Einführung in die Ethik Sarnen:  Selbstverlag Benediktinerkollegium 1962 (OCLC: 832441031)

See also
 Ein Benediktinermönch im Dienste seines Ordens Bernard Kälins Wirken als Rektor, Abt und Abtprimas, 1941-1962 by Martina Roder, Zürich: Chronos 2017 (ISBN 9783034014175)

References

External links
 Muri-Gries Abbey (in German and Italian)
 The Benedictine Confederation of Congregations of Monasteries of the Order of Saint Benedict (in Italian and English)
 International Atlas of Benedictine Monasteries (in English)
 Pontificio Ateneo Sant'Anselmo (in Italian and English)
 Collegio Sant'Anselmo (in Italian and English)

1887 births
1962 deaths
Abbots Primate
Benedictine scholars
Benedictine writers
20th-century Christian monks
Benedictine abbots
Swiss abbots
Swiss Roman Catholics
Swiss Benedictines